Porky's Poultry Plant is a 1936 Warner Bros. Looney Tunes cartoon directed by Frank Tashlin and composed by Carl Stalling (their first short as director and composer, respectfully for Warner Brothers). The short was released on August 22, 1936, and stars Porky Pig. It is most noted for its dramatic camera angles and filmic techniques typically seen in live-action films, something Tashlin specialised in.

Plot
Porky Pig is running his own poultry plant consisting of chickens, chicks, ducks and geese. Porky does his daily morning corn feeding. Later Porky sadly looks at photos of some of his chickens all taken away by a chicken-hawk and he shakes his fists at the poster of said chicken-hawk, vowing to get it once and for all.

Soon that very chicken-hawk approaches the poultry plant. Porky raises the alarm and all birds manage to hide except one little chick. The mother hen Henrietta notices that one of her chicks is missing and the chicken-hawk has taken him away. Porky drives his airplane out of the barn and pursues the chicken-hawk. After Porky blows off some tail feathers, the chicken-hawk calls for reinforcements from other chicken-hawks. The whole squadron almost has Porky crash landing but Porky retaliates and the rescue for the chicken becomes a football game. Porky rescues the chick and expels smoke on the chicken-hawk squadron. As the squadron falls, the hens dig a hole and bury the squadron after they land in.

As Porky lands his plane, there seems to be another chicken-hawk circling around, but it's only Porky's weather vane.

Home media
This short was released on the Looney Tunes Golden Collection: Volume 4 DVD box set on November 14, 2006.

This short was released on the Porky Pig 101 DVD box set on September 19, 2017.

References

External links

1936 films
1936 war films
1936 short films
1936 comedy films
1936 animated films
1930s American animated films
1930s animated short films
1930s action comedy films
1930s action war films
1930s war comedy films
1930s English-language films
1930s Warner Bros. animated short films
American animated short films
American action comedy films
American action war films
American war comedy films
American black-and-white films
Animated action films
Animated war films
Looney Tunes shorts
Porky Pig films
Fictional birds of prey
Animated films about chickens
Animated films about ducks
Fictional geese
Films set on farms
Films set in 1936
Short films directed by Frank Tashlin
Films scored by Carl Stalling
Warner Bros. Cartoons animated short films